The joints in the hand are joints found at the distal end of the upper limb.

The joints are:
 In the wrist there is the radiocarpal joint between the radius and carpus.  Between the carpal bones are the intercarpal articulations and the midcarpal joint.
 The carpometacarpal joint connects the carpal bones to the metacarpus or metacarpal bones which are joined at the intermetacarpal articulations.
 In the fingers, finally, are the metacarpophalangeal joints (including the knuckles) between the metacarpal bones and the phalanges or finger bones which are interconnected by the interphalangeal joints.

Hand